The Washington Manual of Medical Therapeutics is a medical textbook first published in 1942 by Wayland MacFarlane, a professor at the Washington University School of Medicine and chief of the internal medicine ward. Described as the "bible of the medical ward" the Washington Manual of Medical Therapeutics is now in its Thirty-Sixth Edition and currently it is now the best-selling medical textbook in the world, with more than 200,000 copies worldwide. It has been translated into numerous languages including Spanish, Portuguese, Greek, Hungarian, Romanian, Turkish, Korean, Japanese and both simplified and classical Chinese. The book's current editors are Hilary E.L. Reno, Daniel H. Cooper, Andrew J. Krainik, and Sam J. Lubner.

External links
Washington Manual of Medical Therapeutics Source: Lippincott Williams & Wilkins (LWW)

Washington University in St. Louis
Medical manuals